"Take It" is a song by Australian house music producer Dom Dolla. It was released in July 2018. 

At the ARIA Music Awards of 2019, the song was nominated for ARIA Award for Best Dance Release.
At the APRA Music Awards of 2020, the song was nominated for Most Performed Dance Work of the Year.

Reception
Billboard called the song "one spicy funk jam" saying "The Australian producer's runaway hit uses trippy melodies, jackin' rhythm and toe-curling synth bass to burrow into your brain and make your whole body move."

Track listing
Digital download (SWEATDS336)
 "Take It" – 3:54

Digital download (remixes) (SWEATDS338DJ)
 "Take It" (Billy Kenny Remix) – 5:18
 "Take It" (Wongo Remix) – 5:10
 "Take It" (ZDS Remix)	– 6:40
 "Take It" (Jay Robinson Remix) – 4:45
 "Take It" (Holmes John Remix) – 4:21

Digital download (Sonny Fodera remix)
 "Take It" – 3:40

Charts

Weekly charts

Year-end charts

See also
 List of number-one club tracks of 2018 (Australia)

References

2018 singles
2018 songs
Dom Dolla songs
Song recordings produced by Dom Dolla
Songs written by Dom Dolla